The European and African Zone was one of the three zones of regional Davis Cup competition in 2006.

In the European and African Zone there were four different groups in which teams compete against each other to advance to the next group.

Participating teams

Draw 

Zimbabwe, Ireland, Egypt, and South Africa relegated to Group III in 2007.
Macedonia and Georgia promoted to Group I in 2007.

First Round Matches

Greece vs. Macedonia

Second Round Matches

Norway vs. Macedonia

Third Round Matches

Macedonia vs. Finland

Play-off Matches 

2006 Davis Cup Europe/Africa Zone
Davis Cup Europe/Africa Zone